Ermes Espinoza Veloz (born 1987) is a Cuban chess grandmaster.

Chess career
He played in the Chess World Cup 2015, being defeated by the eventual winner Sergey Karjakin in the first round. He was awarded the title of Grandmaster (GM) by FIDE in 2017.

References

External links 

Ermes Espinoza Veloz chess games at 365Chess.com

1987 births
Living people
Chess grandmasters
Cuban chess players